Henry C. Mustin may refer to:

Henry C. Mustin (1874–1923), pioneering naval aviator 
, two ships of the U.S. Navy
Henry C. Mustin Naval Air Facility
Henry C. Mustin (1933–2016), his grandson, vice admiral in the U.S. Navy